Agnete Friis (married name Varn) is a former Danish badminton player. She became Danish Champion in the women's singles in 1941 and 1944 and nine times in women's doubles from 1941–1958. She played for the national team until the end of the 1950s. 
She also reached three All England Championship Finals in all three categories in 1953. In the singles final she lost to Marie Ussing; the two of them lost the doubles final to Iris Cooley and June White of Great Britain and in the mixed doubles with Poul Holm, they were defeated by Eddy Choong and June White.

Medal Record at the All England Badminton Championships

References

Danish female badminton players
20th-century Danish women